Antomanov (masculine) or Antomanova (feminine) is a Russian last name.

While this last name is considered to simply be a variety of the last name Avtonomov (which is derived from a patronymic itself derived from the male first name Avtonom), it is also possible that this particular form was influenced by the first name Anton.

References

Notes

Sources
И. М. Ганжина (I. M. Ganzhina). "Словарь современных русских фамилий" (Dictionary of Modern Russian Last Names). Москва, 2001. 



Russian-language surnames